Konikowski is a Polish surname. Notable people with the surname include:

Alex Konikowski (1928–1997), American baseball player
Jerzy Konikowski (born 1947), Polish-German chess player, problemist, and author

Polish-language surnames